Functional magnetic resonance imaging (fMRI) of the spinal cord (spinal fMRI) is an adaptation of the fMRI method that has been developed for use in the brain (1).  Although the basic principles underlying the methods are the same, spinal fMRI requires a number of specific adaptations to accommodate the periodic motion of the spinal cord, the small cross-sectional dimensions (roughly 8 mm x 15 mm at the largest region), the length (~45 cm in adult humans), and the fact that the magnetic field that is used for  MRI varies with position in the spinal cord because of magnetic susceptibility differences between bone and tissues.  Spinal fMRI has been used to produce maps of neuronal activity at most levels of the spinal cord in response to various stimuli, such as touch, vibration, and thermal changes, and with motor tasks.  Research applications of spinal fMRI to date include studies of normal sensory and motor function, and studies of the effects of trauma to the spinal cord (1-3) and multiple sclerosis (4).  Two different data acquisition methods have been applied, one based on the established BOLD (blood-oxygen-level dependent) fMRI methods used in the brain, and the other based on SEEP (signal enhancement by extravascular water protons) contrast with essentially proton-density weighted spin-echo imaging (see  MRI).  The majority of the studies published to date are based on the SEEP contrast method.  Methods demonstrated to overcome the challenges listed above include using a recording of the heart-beat to account for the related time course of spinal cord motion, acquiring image data with relatively high (~ 1-2 mm) spatial resolution to detect fine structural details, and acquiring images in thin contiguous sagittal slices to span a large extent of the spinal cord.  Methods based on BOLD contrast have employed parallel imaging techniques to accelerate data acquisition, and imaging slices transverse to the spinal cord, in order to reduce the effects of spatial magnetic field distortions (5).  Methods based on SEEP contrast have been developed specifically because they have low sensitivity to magnetic field distortions while maintaining sensitivity to changes in neuronal activity.

References
 Stroman PW. Magnetic resonance imaging of neuronal function in the spinal cord: spinal FMRI. Clin Med Res 2005;3(3):146-156.
 Stroman PW, Kornelsen J, Bergman A, Krause V, Ethans K, Malisza KL, Tomanek B. Noninvasive assessment of the injured human spinal cord by means of functional magnetic resonance imaging. Spinal Cord 2004;42(2):59-66.
 Kornelsen J, Stroman PW. fMRI of the lumbar spinal cord during a lower limb motor task. Magn Reson Med 2004;52(2):411-414.
 Agosta F, Valsasina P, Caputo D, Stroman PW, Filippi M. Tactile-associated recruitment of the cervical cord is altered in patients with multiple sclerosis. Neuroimage 2008;39(4):1542-1548.
 Maieron M, Iannetti GD, Bodurka J, Tracey I, Bandettini PA, Porro CA. Functional responses in the human spinal cord during willed motor actions: evidence for side- and rate-dependent activity. J Neurosci 2007;27(15):4182-4190.

Neuroimaging